Kaitieke  or Kaitīeke is a rural community, located south of Taumarunui and  west of Raurimu, in the Ruapehu District and Manawatū-Whanganui region of New Zealand's North Island.

The area's name translates as to eat (kai) the saddleback bird (tieke).

History

The area's steep rugged hills and valleys were once covered in thick native forest. However, with the arrival of European settlers in the early 1900s, most local forests were felled for farming between 1908 and 1915.

Kaitīeke School opened in 1910, and some small sawmills operated in the area during the 1920s.

The Spanish flu had a devastating impact on the community in November 1918, killing about 23% of the local Māori population.

Painter Edward (Ted) Lattey farmed south of the settlement in the 1920s, before leaving the King Country to become a professional painter. He became known for his paintings of native forests, including King Country scenes.

During World War I and again during the Great Depression, many farmers abandoned the land. By the mid-1930s about half the land cleared for farming had reverted to fern and scrub, and high rainfall caused soils to leach and lose their fertility. It was not until the introduction of aerial fertiliser topdressing after World War II that farming conditions began to improve.

The Kaitieke War Memorial was installed in January 1923, commemorating the 23 local men who died in World War I. A further inscription was made after World War II for the six local men who died in that war.

The Kaitieke and Retaruke Valley sports contest took place annually during Easter Weekend from 1917 until 2017, before ending because of a dwindling local population. The final event, in April 2017, featured period costumes.

Education

References

Populated places in Manawatū-Whanganui
Ruapehu District